A ship station (or ship radio station) is a radio station located on board a sea vessel. The ITU Radio Regulations define it as "A mobile station in the maritime mobile service located on board a vessel which is not permanently moored, other than a survival craft station."

Each station is classified by the service in which it operates, permanently or temporarily. Ship station requirements may be established by law or international treaty. For instance large cargo ships traveling the open seas may be required to have long-distance communications equipment, whereas coastal ship may only need short range communications. Operating such stations may require a license.

Bridge-to-bridge station

In telecommunication, a bridge-to-bridge station is a station operating in the port operations service in which messages are restricted to navigational communications and which is capable of operation from the ship's navigational bridge or, in the case of a dredge, from its main control station, operating on a frequency or frequencies in the 156-162 MHz band. bridge-to-bridge operations are a part of the Federal Standard 1037C and the NTIA Manual of Regulations and Procedures for Federal Radio Frequency Management.

See also 

 Marine VHF radio

References 

Radio stations and systems ITU
Maritime communication